Thell Reed is an American exhibition shooter, stuntman, armorer, and movie consultant.

Shooting career
As a teenager, Reed competed in Jeff Cooper's Big Bear "Leatherslaps" shooting competitions at Big Bear Lake, California. The Leatherslaps became the "South Western Combat Pistol League" or "SWCPL". Reed competed so successfully that he became one of six "Combat Masters", so called because they would almost always take the first six places in the competition. Of the six Combat Masters, Reed had the quickest draw.

The Combat Masters were:
 Jack Weaver
 John Plähn
 Elden Carl
 Ray Chapman
 Thell Reed
 Jeff Cooper

After the SWCPL matches, Reed went on to compete in fast draw competitions in which he achieved fame. His celebrity gained him entry into the movie industry and he became an advisor to the movie industry on the use of firearms. He trained actors such as Russell Crowe and Brad Pitt for acting roles involving the use of pistols. He also trained Michael Biehn for the film Tombstone. Biehn portrayed Johnny Ringo, a notorious and highly skilled gunfighter.

Personal life
Reed is the father of set armorer Hannah Gutierrez Reed, who was the head armorer for Rust during the October 2021 Rust movie set shooting incident.

See also
Weapons master
Fast Draw

References

External links
 
 The SWPCL competitions 

American male sport shooters
American stunt performers
Living people
Year of birth missing (living people)
Place of birth missing (living people)